Reef lobsters, Enoplometopus, are a genus of small lobsters that live on reefs in the Indo-Pacific, Caribbean and warmer parts of the Atlantic Ocean.

Description
They are brightly coloured, with stripes, rings, or spots. They are typically mainly red, orange, purplish and white. Reef lobsters are small (depending on species, up to ), nocturnal (spending the day in caves or crevices), and very timid. The species can be distinguished by their colouration and morphology.

 
As a result of their bright colours, they are popular in the aquarium trade, and unregulated collection combined with destruction of coral reefs may threaten some species. Due to uncertainty over the impact of these potential threats, the majority are considered data deficient by the International Union for Conservation of Nature.

Reef lobsters are distinguished from clawed lobsters (family Nephropidae) by having full chelae (claws) only on the first pair of pereiopods, the second and third pairs being only subchelate (where the last segment of the appendage can press against a short projection from the penultimate one). Clawed lobsters have full claws on the first three pereiopods. Males, unlike those of nephropoid lobsters, have an extra lobe on the second pleopod, which is assumed to have some function in reproduction. Reef lobsters have a shallow cervical groove while clawed lobsters have a deep cervical groove.

Although there is no fossil record of reef lobsters, there is some evidence that they may be related to the extinct genus Eryma which lived from the Permo-Triassic to the late Cretaceous.

Species
The genus contains the following species:
Enoplometopus antillensis Lütken, 1865
Enoplometopus callistus Intès and Le Loeuff, 1970
Enoplometopus chacei Kensley and Child, 1986
Enoplometopus crosnieri Chan and Yu, 1998
Enoplometopus daumi Holthuis, 1983
Enoplometopus debelius Holthuis, 1983
Enoplometopus gracilipes (De Saint Laurent, 1988)
Enoplometopus holthuisi Gordon, 1968
Enoplometopus occidentalis (Randall, 1840)
Enoplometopus pictus A. Milne Edwards, 1862
Enoplometopus voigtmanni Türkay, 1989

References

Decapods